The Sportsplex at Matthews is a large sports complex and park in Matthews, North Carolina, southeast of Charlotte, featuring 12 full-sized soccer fields anchored by a 2,300-seat stadium. The stadium currently seats 5,000 as it has been expanded using modular seating.

In 2018 bleacher seating was placed around Field 10 creating a smaller auxiliary stadium used by the Charlotte Independence as a training field and occasionally by the Charlotte Eagles and Lady Eagles for matches.

History
The idea of a sports complex along the outer-belt in Matthews was first proposed in the early 21st century with the official groundbreaking taking place on May 17, 2012 following years of delays due to the global 2007–2012 global financial crisis. Originally called the Matthews Sportsplex the name was changed during construction. Following a soft opening in 2015, the complex was completed in early 2017.

In August 2019 the stadium hosted the Charlotte Football Kickoff, a high school football double-header that had previously been played at American Legion Memorial Stadium in Charlotte.

The Sportsplex was one of the hosts for the 2020 NCAA Division I Men's Soccer Tournament and the 2020 NCAA Division I Women's Soccer Tournament.

The Sportsplex will host the 2025 Men's & Women's NCAA Division II soccer championships with Wingate University acting as the host school.

References

Charlotte Eagles
American football venues in North Carolina
Sports venues in Mecklenburg County, North Carolina
Lacrosse venues in North Carolina
Soccer venues in North Carolina
USL Championship stadiums
2015 establishments in North Carolina
Sports venues completed in 2015
Charlotte Independence
Sports complexes in the United States
Former National Independent Soccer Association stadiums